Fanny is a 1933 Italian comedy film directed by Mario Almirante and starring Dria Paola, Alfredo De Sanctis and Mino Doro. It is an adaptation of Marcel Pagnol's 1931 play Fanny. The film's art direction was by Gastone Medin.

Cast
 Dria Paola as Fanny  
 Alfredo De Sanctis as Cesare  
 Mino Doro as Mario  
 Lamberto Picasso as Panizza 
 Olga Capri as Onoria 
 Umberto Sacripante as Mangiapane

References

Bibliography 
 Goble, Alan. The Complete Index to Literary Sources in Film. Walter de Gruyter, 1999.

External links 
 

1933 films
1930s Italian-language films
Italian comedy films
1933 comedy films
Films based on works by Marcel Pagnol
Films directed by Mario Almirante
Italian black-and-white films
Cines Studios films
1930s Italian films